Manual labour (in Commonwealth English, manual labor in American English) or manual work is physical work done by humans, in contrast to labour by machines and working animals. It is most literally work done with the hands (the word manual coming from the Latin word for hand) and, by figurative extension, it is work done with any of the muscles and bones of the human body. For most of human prehistory and history, manual labour and its close cousin, animal labour, have been the primary ways that physical work has been accomplished. Mechanisation and automation, which reduce the need for human and animal labour in production, have existed for centuries, but it was only starting in the 18th and 19th centuries that they began to significantly expand and to change human culture. To be implemented, they require that sufficient technology exist and that its capital costs be justified by the amount of future wages that they will obviate. Semi-automation is an alternative to worker displacement that combines human labour, automation, and computerization to leverage the advantages of both man and machine.

Although nearly any work can potentially have skill and intelligence applied to it, many jobs that mostly comprise manual labour—such as fruit and vegetable picking, manual materials handling (for example, shelf stocking), manual digging, or manual assembly of parts—often may be done successfully (if not masterfully) by unskilled or semiskilled workers. For these reasons, there is a partial but significant correlation between manual labour and unskilled or semiskilled workers. Based on economic and social conflict of interest, people may often distort that partial correlation into an exaggeration that equates manual labour with lack of skill; with lack of any potential to apply skill (to a task) or to develop skill (in a worker); and with low social class. Throughout human existence the latter has involved a spectrum of variants, from slavery (with stigmatisation of the slaves as 'subhuman'), to caste or caste-like systems, to subtler forms of inequality.

Economic competition often results in businesses trying to buy labour at the lowest possible cost (for example, through offshoring or by employing foreign workers) or to obviate it entirely (through mechanisation and automation).

Relationship between low skill and low social class
There is a strong correlation between manual labour and unskilled or semiskilled workers, despite the fact that nearly any work can potentially have skill and intelligence applied to it (for example, the artisanal skill of craft production, or the logic of applied science). It has always been the case for humans that many workers begin their working lives lacking any special level of skill or experience. (In the past two centuries, education has become more important and more widely disseminated; but even today, not everyone can know everything, or have experience in a great number of occupations.) It has also always been the case that there was a large amount of manual labour to be done; and that much of it was simple enough to be successfully (if not masterfully) done by unskilled or semiskilled workers, which has meant that there have always been plenty of people with the potential to do it. These conditions have assured the correlation's strength and persistence.

 Throughout human prehistory and history, wherever social class systems have developed, the social status of manual labourers has, more often than not, been low, as most physical tasks were done by peasants, serfs, slaves, indentured servants, wage slaves, or domestic servants. For example, legal scholar L. Ali Khan analyses how the Greeks, Hindus, English, and Americans all created sophisticated social structures to outsource manual labour to distinct classes, castes, ethnicities, or races.

The phrase "hard labour" has even become a legal euphemism for penal labour, which is a custodial sentence during which the convict is not only confined but also put to manual work. Such work may be productive, as on a prison farm or in a prison kitchen, laundry, or library; may be completely unproductive, with the only purpose being the effect of the punishment on the convict; or somewhere in between (such as chain gang work, treadwheel work, or the proverbial "breaking rocks"—the latter two of which are almost certain to be economically unproductive today, although they sometimes served economic purpose in the preindustrial past).

There has always been a tendency among people of the higher gradations of social class to oversimplify the [partial] correlation between manual labour and lack of skill (or need for skill) into one of equivalence, leading to dubious exaggerations such as the notion that anyone who worked physically could be identified by that very fact as being unintelligent or unskilled, or that any task requiring physical work must (by that very fact) be simplistic and not worthy of analysis (or of being done by anyone with intelligence or social rank). Given the human cognitive tendency toward rationalisation, it is natural enough that such grey areas (partial correlations) have often been warped into absolutes (black and white thinking) by people seeking to justify and perpetuate their social advantage.

Throughout human existence, but most especially since the Age of Enlightenment, there have been logically complementary efforts by intelligent workers to counteract these flawed oversimplifications. For example, the American and French Revolutions rejected notions of inherited social status (aristocracy, nobility, monarchy), and the labour movements of the 19th and 20th centuries led to the formation of trade unions who enjoyed substantial collective bargaining power for a time. Such counteractive efforts have been all the more difficult because not all social status differences and wealth differences are unfair; meritocracy is a part of real life, just as rationalisation and unfairness are.

Social systems of every ideological persuasion, from Marxism to syndicalism to the American Dream, have attempted to achieve a successfully functioning classless society in which honest, productive manual labourers can have every bit of social status and power that honest, productive managers can have. Humans have not yet succeeded in instantiating any such utopia, but some social systems have been designed that go far enough toward the goal that hope yet remains for further improvement. 

At its highest extreme, the rationalised distortion by economic elites produces cultures of slavery and complete racial subordination, such as slavery in ancient Greece and Rome; slavery in the United States; or slavery under Nazism (which was defeated in 1945). Concepts such as the Three-fifths compromise and the Untermensch defined slaves as less than human.

In the middle of the spectrum, such distortion may produce systems of fairly rigid class stratification, usually rationalised with fairly strong cultural norms of biologically inherited social inequality, such as feudalism; traditional forms of aristocracy and monarchy; colonialism; and caste systems (e.g., Apartheid, separate but equal/Jim Crow, Indian caste). One interesting historical trend that is true of all of the systems above is that they began crumbling in the 20th century and have continued crumbling since. Today's forms of them are mostly greatly weakened compared to past generations' versions.

At the lowest extreme, such distortion produces subtler forms of racism and de facto (but not de jure) inequality of opportunity. The more plausible the deniability, the easier the rationalisation and perpetuation. For example, as inequality of opportunity and racism grow smaller and subtler, their appearance may converge toward that of meritocracy, to the point that valid instances of each can be found extensively intermingled. At such areas of the spectrum, it becomes ever harder to justify efforts that use de jure methods to fight de facto imbalances (such as affirmative action), because valid instances can be highlighted by all sides. On one side, the cry is ongoing oppression (ignored or denied) from above; on the other side, the cry is reverse discrimination; ample valid evidence exists for both cases, and the problem of its anecdotal nature leaves no clear policy advantage to either side.

Recognizing the potential for skill 
Although manual labour is often stigmatized as lacking specific skills or intelligence, there are a variety of cognitive functions that it can require:

Contextual application: manual labourers must know procedures and be able to implement them while also being flexible to work within specific parameters. For example, servers must not only know all the set procedures for taking orders and carrying food, but they must also be able to react and adapt to their changing environments, including the number of customers, specific requests, potential allergies, etc. Similarly, cosmetologists must know the properties and mechanics of cutting hair while also staying up to date on fashion trends and balancing what each customer wants with what the stylist believes is feasible. Other occupations such as carpentry, plumbing, and welding involve familiarity with tools and vocabulary as well as the ability to apply those skills to specific tasks, typically requiring problem solving and critical thinking.
Situational awareness and interpersonal skills: manual labourers must be aware of their surroundings and develop excellent spatial understanding as well as effective communication skills. As an example, servers have to multi-task and effectively manage their time between taking orders, obtaining the food from the kitchen, dealing with the receipts, and participating in small talk with the customers. Carpenters and plumbers also develop disciplined perception as well as sensory, kinesthetic, and cognitive abilities that are maximized even with limited physical space. Cosmetologists must learn to read their clients by listening to what styles they envision while also observing nonverbal cues about their likes and dislikes, and this often involves being personable and friendly.
Innovation: manual labour is surprisingly creative and dynamic, involving using what is already known to create something entirely new and unique. Cosmetologists infuse their own ideas into their hairstyles, combining what is known about different hair types and methods of hair cutting with their personal tastes and experiences. Carpenters similarly emphasize craftsmanship in their work, attending to precision to ensure that the end products are aesthetically pleasing as well as structurally sound. Even welding is aesthetic, with individual welders considering their markings to be similar to artists' tags.

A willingness to recognise that manual labour can involve skill and intelligence can take a variety of forms, depending on how it handles multifaceted questions of dignity and (in)equality.

 In its healthier forms, it recognises the dignity and intelligence of blue-collar workers (that is, that those workers as a group have just as much potential for dignity and intelligence, despite the fact that any individual workers may or may not display such traits), and it recognises their civil (and civic) equality with white-collar workers. Yet it simultaneously leaves room in society for meritocracy, allowing both upward and downward social mobility (as a sustainable meritocracy requires).
 An example of such systems is provided by well-run instances of professional sports teams, because there is a perennial meritocratic turnover of players, coaches, and staff, both within the sport and as input and output through its boundaries, whereby all participants have dignity even though all of the required talents may not exist in each individual. (For example, the talents of the physical therapists, statisticians, elderly coaches, and young adult players are not equal, but they are complementary from a systems engineering perspective.)
 In its more pathological forms, it may only admit that there can be a science of manual labour, but not acknowledge or allow adequate social mobility (both upward and downward) between the blue-collar and white-collar classes. On the other hand, and equally pathologically, it may willfully deny the natural differences between individuals, allowing no hope for meritocratic justice, which is not only dispiriting to talented and hard-working people, but also highly injurious to macroeconomic performance.
 An example of the first pathology is that the earliest forms of applying science to the practical processes of industry and commerce fell victim to an incomplete understanding, as exemplified by Frederick Winslow Taylor's version of the "science of shoveling". Taylor correctly recognised that the physical (athletic) talents for shoveling (on one hand) and the mental talents for analyzing and synthesizing best shoveling techniques and workflows (on the other) often would not coexist in the same person. Some people would have only the first; others, only the second. Therefore, (speaking metaphorically), players usually should not be their own coaches. Unfortunately, Taylor stepped from that valid realisation to envisioning a system of business administration that might easily have failed to filter people into the right roles based on their individual talents (or lack thereof). Taylor's versions of scientific management, had they succeeded in persisting, may well have eventually left some smart people stranded in an underclass (crassly equated with draft animals, which was fashionable at the time) at the same time that it let some incompetent but silver-spooned people remain in positions of middle or senior management. Whether Taylor was capable of predicting and preventing that problem is unclear, but it is clear that not all of his imitators and admirers were thus capable.
 An example of the second pathology are 20th-century variants of communism, such as Leninism and Stalinism.
 Somewhere between the extremes of health and pathology mentioned above are the realities in most developed economies today, where various themes and tendencies are in constant competition, and people disagree on which ones predominate and what actions should be taken (if any) to try to even the balance or reduce the pathologies.

Formal learning and training
Formal learning scenarios, such as vocational classrooms, apprenticeships and academic studies, supply a theoretical approach to building skillsets. Learners acquire a systematic and procedural view of tasks, based on the specific parameters and needs of a job's intended outcome. The parameters are defined by the purpose of the job and the tools used to achieve it. Hair styling, for example, requires learners to gain competence in the methods of shaping, cutting, washing, dying, combing, and various other active manual skills, the proficiency of which will determine the final product. In such situations, the learner is guided and directed by educators in their technique and form, and learn to interpret a tool’s use in meeting the requirements of a task or project based on the expectation of the result.

Informal learning and training
Informal learning can be summarized as any activity which concerns the pursuit of understanding, knowledge, or skill that occurs without an imposed curriculum and explicit assessment. It typically manifests itself as practical engagement in the pursuit of knowledge. 
There are several ways which informal learning is conducted, that range from self-directed learning, observational learning, where there is intention to seek specific information outside of formal environments, to the coincidental learning that comes out of experiences. Informal training differs from formal training in that it focuses on the acquisition of a skill, understanding, or job-specific knowledge. The cognitive skills acquired outside of formal learning environment also help to define the mastery of what are considered "blue collar" jobs. The understanding of technique and method taken from formal training is expanded on in developing contextual application, situational awareness, and innovation based skills. Informal learning provides workers with opportunities of cognitive development unique to their field's context.That knowledge of context, derived from past experiences in comparable situations, dictates the use of one technique or plan over another. Plumbing, as an example, requires knowledge of piping and the mechanics of water systems, but also relies on details such as house age, the materials from which the specific plumbing system is made, how those materials react given different external changes or alterations, and a comprehension of hypothetical conditions and the resulting behavior of the problem and other related components when said conditions are brought into effect. These skills and understandings are inherent in both learning processes. As a whole, this type of knowledge is more learner-centered and situational in response to the interests or needed application of the skill to a particular workforce.

Relationship to mechanisation and automation
Mechanisation and automation strive to reduce the amount of manual labour required for production. The motives for this reduction of effort may be to remove drudgery from people's lives; to lower the unit cost of production; or, as mechanisation evolves into automation, to bring greater flexibility (easier redesign, lower lead time) to production. Mechanisation occurred first in tasks that required either little dexterity or at least a narrow repertoire of dextrous movements, such as providing motive force or tractive force (locomotives; traction engines; marine steam engines; early cars, trucks, and tractors); digging, loading, and unloading bulk materials (steam shovels, early loaders); or weaving uncomplicated cloth (early looms). For example, Henry Ford described his efforts to mechanise agricultural tasks such as tillage as relieving drudgery by transferring physical burdens from human and animal bodies to iron and steel machinery. Automation helps to bring mechanisation to more complicated tasks that require finer dexterity, decision making based on visual input, and a wider variety of intelligent movements. Thus even tasks that once could not be successfully mechanised, such as shelf stocking or many kinds of fruit and vegetable picking, tend to undergo process redesign (either formal or informal) leading to ever smaller amounts of manual labour.

Relationship to offshoring, worker migration, penal labour, and military service

Many of the methods by which socioeconomically advantaged people have maintained a supply of cheap labour over the centuries are now either defunct or greatly curtailed. These include peasantry, serfdom, slavery, indentured servitude, wage slavery, and domestic servitude. But motives to get labour cheaply still remain. Today, although businesses can no longer get away with using de jure slavery, economic competition ensures that they will typically try to buy labour at the lowest possible cost or to reduce the need for it through mechanisation and automation. Various present-day methods of ensuring low labour costs are detailed below.

The first and most basic method is the domestic labour market within one country (or region thereof), in which workers compete with each other for jobs. Within this market, further market segmentation is possible. Businesses try to avoid overtime (when practical). They often try to avoid employing full-time employees (FTEs) in favor of part-time employees (PTEs) or contingent workers (for example, temporary workers, freelancers, cottage workers, contractors (who may have subcontractors), or day labourers), all of which usually entail less obligation for employee benefits (compensation beyond the wages themselves). Agencies tasked with enforcing labour law are supposed to be perennially on guard against the avidity with which employers find clever ways to make people function like FTEs but carry nominal labels as contractors, freelancers, or PTEs (e.g., dishonest worker classification, unpaid overtime). Other avenues of discount labour are the institutions of apprenticeship and cooperative education (including work-study programs), and (relatedly) the informal tradition of the "broke college student who works for peanuts". Here, the low wages are often credibly justified by the inexperience and incomplete training of the worker.

The domestic labour market may also extend beyond "normal" workers to various kinds of employing prisoners (e.g., penal labour, work release). Even military employment, most especially by conscription or other mandatory national service, is a means of employing labour at lowest cost (compared to costlier alternatives such as all-volunteer militaries).

The next step beyond domestic labour markets (within countries) is the global labour market (between countries), in which all workers on Earth compete with each other, albeit via imperfect competition. Differences between regions and countries in standard of living and (relatedly) prevailing wage rates provide a perennial incentive for businesses to send manual tasks to remote workers (via offshoring) or to bring remote workers to the manual tasks (via immigration of foreign workers, whether illegal  or legal [guest-worker programs codified with work permits]). The nature of the work determines its relative degree of geographical transferability; for example, manual assembly work in factories can usually be offshored, whereas tillage and harvesting are anchored to the location of the crop fields. One characteristic of offshoring and worker migration that is especially useful to businesses is that they can provide employers with (fuzzy-boundaried) subpopulations of inexpensive workers without resorting to biological-inheritance-based rationalisations (such as racial slavery, feudalism and aristocracy, or caste-based division of labour).

Penal labour is an intersection of the low skill/low social class idea (serfs, slaves, wage slaves) and the class-neutral labour-cost reduction idea (offshoring, foreign workers, contingent workers). Like offshoring and guest worker programs, penal labour is an opportunity for businesses to get cheap manual labour without denying the humanity of the workers—and in some cases even seeming civically responsible ("providing second chances to live right and work honestly"). Thus socioeconomic systems, regardless of their capitalist, socialist, or syncretised ideological bases, need to remain vigilant that they resist any tendency toward the overimprisonment of workers, because it could align with the financial interests of businesses, government, or both, stoking the same human mechanisms of specious rationalisation that justified slavery or wage slavery.

Military enlistment (whether conscription, other mandatory service, or volunteer service) shares some similarities with penal labour when viewed from this perspective, in that it may synergistically provide (1) discount labour for a government or its contractors at the same time that it also provides (2) opportunities to the workers or soldiers themselves (for example, more job security, better-quality health insurance, better-quality retirement-savings plans, and/or more educational opportunities [most especially technical training, but sometimes also broader university education as well]). These many benefits cannot accurately be pigeon-holed as all good or all bad. They are inevitably double-edged blades, and must be dynamically managed and monitored to keep them from leaving the healthy range of the spectrum and moving into pathological ranges. For that to succeed, there must also exist some decent level of employment opportunity, compensation, and psychological security in the private sector, especially non–defense community businesses.

Paramilitary, police, and corrections (prison guard) service are other segments of employment that reflect the traits of military service in this respect.

See also
Construction worker
Critique of work
Elbow grease
Industrialisation
Manual labor college
Proletariat
Refusal of work
Roughneck
Shadow work
The Idler (1993)
The South African Wine Initiative

References

Bibliography

External links
Musculoskeletal Disorders
LaborFair Resources (Fair Labor Practices)

Employment classifications
Labor
Work